Jensen is a census-designated place in eastern Uintah County, Utah, United States. The population was 412 at the 2010 census. It lies along the Green River and U.S. Route 40, southeast of the city of Vernal, the county seat of Uintah County, and about 17 miles west of the Colorado border. Although Jensen is unincorporated, it has a post office, with the ZIP code of 84035.

Jensen was first settled in 1877 and named for Lars Jensen, an early prospector and ferryman. Today its main importance is as the Utah entrance to Dinosaur National Monument.

Demographics
As of the census of 2010, there were 412 people living in the CDP. There were 156 housing units. The racial makeup of the town was 91.3% White, 0.2% Black or African American, 5.3% from some other race, and 3.2% from two or more races. Hispanic or Latino of any race were 6.3% of the population.

Climate
According to the Köppen Climate Classification system, Jensen has a semi-arid climate, abbreviated "BSk" on climate maps.

See also

 List of census-designated places in Utah

References

External links

Populated places established in 1877
Census-designated places in Uintah County, Utah
Census-designated places in Utah
1877 establishments in Utah Territory